Major Philip Albert Meldon  (18 December 1874 – 8 April 1942) was an Irish cricketer and a British Army officer in more than one war.

Biography
He was born in Dublin, Ireland, the eldest son of Sir Albert Meldon. He was commissioned as a second lieutenant in the Royal Field Artillery on 28 March 1900, and was promoted to lieutenant on 3 April 1901. From 1900 to 1902, he served with the 53rd Battery in South Africa during the Second Boer War, and took part in the operations in the Transvaal, east of Pretoria, including engagements at Belfast and Lydenburg. He was awarded a DSO in World War I.

In World War II, Meldon was on Special Employment Foreign Office, in 1940. He was held as a German prisoner from 1 April 1940. He died in London at age 68, on 8 April 1942.

Cricket and football
Meldon played twice for the Irish cricket team; against I Zingari in August 1899 and against H. D. G. Leveson-Gower's XI in 1905. He later played two first-class matches for the MCC in 1911, against Leicestershire and Cambridge University.

Meldon also represented Ireland at football, playing in two international matches in 1899.

Family
Meldon married in 1925 Albreda Bewicke-Copley.

References

External links
Cricket Europe Stats Zone profile

1874 births
1942 deaths
British Army personnel of the Second Boer War
British Army personnel of World War I
Companions of the Distinguished Service Order
Irish cricketers
Marylebone Cricket Club cricketers
Cricketers from Dublin (city)
Irish association footballers (before 1923)
Pre-1950 IFA international footballers
Association football forwards
Military personnel from Dublin (city)